Carpathonesticus birsteini  is a species of araneomorph spider of the family Nesticidae. It occurs Russia and Georgia and is found in caves.

Original publication

References 

Nesticidae
Spiders of Russia
Spiders of Georgia (country)
Spiders described in 1947